Maria Steen is an Irish conservative campaigner. She is a qualified architect and a barrister. She is a member of the Iona Institute, and campaigned against same-sex marriage, and abortion in Ireland.

Involvement in same-sex marriage referendum 
In the run up to the 2015 Irish same-sex marriage referendum, she was one of the members of the Iona Institute who threatened legal action against RTÉ over claims from Rory O'Neill that the Iona Institute were homophobic, and received part of the €85,000 settlement ( "Pantigate").

She participated in TV debates on the run up to the referendum. Ultimately, the referendum was approved by 62% of voters on a turnout of 61%.

Anti-abortion campaigning 
She opposed the Protection of Life During Pregnancy Act 2013, which legislated for the X Case after the A, B and C v Ireland decision from the ECHR, claiming it was "wrong and unnecessary".

She represented the Iona Institute at the Citizen's Assembly, which was discussing Irish abortion law. She campaigned for a No vote in the 2018 Irish abortion referendum, which was approved by the Irish electorate. She often participates in TV debates. The referendum was passed by the Irish electorate by a 66% majority.

Personal life 
Born Maria Davin, she is married to Neil Steen SC, they have five children, who are home schooled. She graduated in 1999 from University College Dublin in Architecture and worked as an Architect with a leading firm for a number of years. She is a qualified barrister, but has not practiced since the birth of her children. Steen is a qualified AMI Montessori teacher. She has written for The Irish Catholic newspaper. Her aunt is Senator Joan Freeman, who unsuccessfully ran in the 2018 Irish presidential election.

See also 
 Iona Institute
 Abortion in the Republic of Ireland
 Eighth Amendment of the Constitution of Ireland

References 

Irish anti-abortion activists
Living people
Irish women activists
Irish barristers
Irish architects
Year of birth missing (living people)
Alumni of King's Inns
Alumni of University College Dublin